Anthony Buxton  (2 September 1881 - 9 August 1970) was a British soldier and author.

He was the youngest son of Edward North Buxton.  He was educated at Harrow and Trinity College, Cambridge.  In 1910 he was involved in the infamous Dreadnought hoax by the Bloomsbury Group.

During the First World War he served as an officer in the Essex Yeomanry, was wounded, mentioned in dispatches, and was awarded the DSO in 1916. He was appointed a deputy lieutenant of Essex in 1920.

He married a Scotswoman, Mary Philomena (née Constable Maxwell) in 1926.  They had a son and three daughters.  She died in 1953

He lived at Horsey Hall in Norfolk.  He was High Sheriff of Norfolk in 1945.

His publications include:
 Sport in Peace and War
 Sporting Interludes at Geneva, 1932
 Fisherman Naturalist, 1946
 Travelling Naturalist, 1948
 Happy Year, 1950
 Plus contributions to reviews and newspapers

References

External links
 

1881 births
1970 deaths
People educated at Harrow School
Alumni of Trinity College, Cambridge
Companions of the Distinguished Service Order
Deputy Lieutenants of Essex
English justices of the peace
Essex Yeomanry officers
High Sheriffs of Norfolk
Dreadnought hoax